Dana Saroop Seetahal SC (July 8, 1955 – May 4, 2014) was an Independent Senator in the Trinidad and Tobago Senate. She was an attorney at law in private practice and was formerly a lecturer at the Hugh Wooding Law School, Trinidad and Tobago, where she held the position of Course Director in Criminal Practice and Procedure. She was assassinated in Port of Spain on May 4, 2014.

Life
Dana Saroop Seetahal  was born on July 8, 1955, in Trinidad and Tobago. She was the eighth of eleven children born to Latchman and Sarjudeya Saroop Seetahal who were of Indian descent. She attended primary school in El Dorado Village, Tunapuna opposite Aramalaya Presbyterian Church. In 1965 she won a scholarship to attend Bishop Anstey High School in Port of Spain. In 1973 she went on to University and received a Bachelor of Laws from the University of the West Indies. In 1977 she attended Hugh Wooding Law School. She graduated and was called to the bar in 1979. After graduating she worked in the Solicitor General's Department, Magistrate, State Prosecutor, Private Practice in Justitia Omnibus. In 2002 she was appointed an Independent Senator in the Parliament of Trinidad and Tobago. She was awarded the status of 'Senior Counsel' in 2006. In 2008 she opened her own chambers, El Dorado Chambers...

Education

Career

After passing the bar Dana Seetahal worked as a State Prosecutor from 1980 to 1987. She prosecuted cases in the magistrates’ courts and later in the High Court. She performed as a Magistrate for one year from 1987 to 1988 but preferred prosecuting. As a magistrate she tried chiefly criminal cases at the summary level and presided at Juvenile Court. Acted as a coroner in inquests and conducted preliminary inquiries in indictable trials.

In 1988 she returned as a Senior State Prosecutor and from 1988 to 1991 she acted as assistant director of Public Prosecutions (DPP). She prosecuted indictable cases (felonies) at the High Court and appeared for the State in criminal matters at the Court of Appeal. Advised the Police and other government departments on criminal matters. Lectured to the police, state and non-governmental organizations, such as Rotary Clubs.

She became a Course Director and Senior Lecturer at Hugh Wooding Law School from 1995 to 2007. She taught and did research in the courses of Criminal Practice & Procedure, the Law of Evidence for ten Caribbean jurisdictions & Legal Drafting.

She was first appointed to Parliament in April 2002 as an Independent Senator in the 7th Republican Parliament. She was again appointed an Independent Senator in the 8th and 9th Parliaments (October 2002 to April 2010). She was not re-appointed to the 10th Parliament.

In January 2006 she was made a Senior Counsel ("took silk"). Her first contribution in the Senate was on The Appropriation Bill, 2003 on October 28, 2002.

As a Senior Counsel in Private Practice she acted as Defence counsel appearing in criminal appellate and trial cases, Special Prosecutor for the State in a variety of matters, public law matters, consultancies in criminal matters, negotiation.

In 2008 she opened her own private chambers "El Dorado Chambers" located in Port of Spain, Trinidad, comprising 3 other lawyers and students.

She wrote a weekly column for the Saturday Express, having previously written for "The Guardian", both local newspaper in Trinidad and Tobago.

Awards and honours

Works  

Her first book the'Commonwealth Caribbean on Criminal Procedure' is the first of its kind to be published. Its credibility is supported not only by her theoretical knowledge, but also her practical knowledge earned over twenty years of experience in the field: as a prosecutor for over a dozen years, as a magistrate, as a criminologist, a criminal justice consultant and finally as a law school lecturer. "This book fills a lacuna in Commonwealth Caribbean jurisprudence in that there is currently no local or regional text on criminal practice and procedure. The content of the book includes both the statute law and common law on criminal practice and procedure in most of the relevant jurisdictions, which include Trinidad Tobago, Guyana, Barbados, Jamaica and Grenada among others."

"Revised throughout, this new edition addresses the recent changes in law in St Lucia and the Bahamas bringing this popular text right up-to-date. Although written for law students, as the only book which deals specifically with criminal practice and procedure in the Caribbean, it is also a useful reference tool for criminal justice professionals." The third edition of this book was released in July 2010, and contains a new chapter on extradition.

Regional Issues of Justice and Governance- Ambassador Colin Granderson and Miss Dana Seetahal.

Publications 

Report on Reform of the Criminal Law and Criminal Procedure: Saint Lucia: November 1999 – March 2000 (For the Government of Saint Lucia)
The Lawyer (Journal of the Law Association of Trinidad & Tobago), March 2001: The Impact of Procedure on Advocacy. Recent Changes in the law in Trinidad and Tobago
Caribbean Journal of Criminology and Social Psychology, January 2000: Pre-trial Publicity and a Fair Trial
Can A Juror Change Her Mind? Bench and Bar of Minnesota, Official Publication of Minnesota State Bar Association, March 1999
The Criminologist, Winter 1998: The effects of Urbanization and Industrialization on Crime: The Commonwealth Caribbean in the 1990s
The Criminal Lawyer, (English Newsletter published by Butterworths) September 1998: Do you wish to retire?
The Lawyer 2005: Child Murderers
The Lawyer, April 1998: HIV/AIDS and Criminal Liability
Caribbean Journal of Criminology and Social Psychology, January 1996:Plea Bargaining in the Caribbean
The Education Act in Cultural Diversity, Politics, Education and Society, 1995, edited book, University of the West Indies
The Lawyer, January 1994: The Jury, Tobago or Trinidad?
The Lawyer, January, 1993: Towards a better future in Corrections: Sentencing Alternatives
The Lawyer, July 1992: Whiteman and the Admissibility of confessions

Consultancies and special projects 
 Consultant, UNIFEM: "Review of Policing and Prosecution of Sexual Offences in St Lucia: May 2009
 Consultant and Trainer, National Insurance Board, NIPDEC House: 3-day Workshop: Training in Investigation for Compliance Officers: July 2009
 Consultant and Trainer, Police Service: Advanced Police Prosecutors Course (2): October–December 2007
 Contracted as Special Prosecutor, Office of the Director of Public Prosecutions, to represent the State in criminal appeals: March 2004 – present
 Consultant to the Government of Saint Lucia: Reform of the Criminal law and Procedure of Saint Lucia, August 1999 – Present. Report submitted November 1999; Laid in Cabinet, January 2000

Death

On May 4, 2014, at 12:05am, Seetahal was assassinated while driving her Volkswagen Touareg SUV in the vicinity of the Woodbrook Youth Club, Port of Spain, Trinidad. She was shot five times.
 
On July 24, 2015, 11 men were arrested and charged with her murder.

References

External links
 Contribution to Caribbean Journal of Criminilogy and Social Psychology
 Senate of Trinidad and Tobago
 Dana Seetahal Memorial Page
 Newspaper Columns by Dana Seetahal

1955 births
2014 deaths
Florida State University alumni
Members of the Senate (Trinidad and Tobago)
20th-century Trinidad and Tobago lawyers
Trinidad and Tobago Senior Counsel
University of the West Indies alumni
Trinidad and Tobago murder victims
People murdered in Trinidad and Tobago
Trinidad and Tobago women lawyers
21st-century Trinidad and Tobago women politicians
21st-century Trinidad and Tobago politicians
21st-century Trinidad and Tobago lawyers